Class D7 (formerly Class A (anthracite), pre-1895) on the Pennsylvania Railroad was a class of  4-4-0 steam locomotive.
Fifty-eight were built by the PRR's Altoona Works (now owned by Norfolk Southern) between 1882–1891 with  drivers, while sixty-one of class D7a were constructed with  drivers.

The D7 was fundamentally an anthracite-burning version of the PRR D6, with a larger fire-grate in order to burn the slower-burning, harder coal.

References

4-4-0 locomotives
D07
Railway locomotives introduced in 1882
Scrapped locomotives
Standard gauge locomotives of the United States
Steam locomotives of the United States